Gaoqing Road is a station on Line 6 of the Shanghai Metro. It began services on December 29, 2007. The station is located at an intersection between Huxiang Road and Laoan Road.

This station is the southern terminus for trains that run short trips along the line during peak hours between here and Jufeng Road.

References 

Railway stations in Shanghai
Line 6, Shanghai Metro
Shanghai Metro stations in Pudong
Railway stations in China opened in 2007